Cattenom is a commune in the Moselle department in Grand Est in north-eastern France.

Geography 
It lies about 8 kilometres north of Thionville. The localities of Homeldange, Husange (aka Hussange) and Sentzich are incorporated in the commune.

Toponymy 
Former names: Cathenem (1182), Kettenem (1214), Kettenhem (1329), Kettenheim (1400), Kerthenhem (1426), Katenem (1432), Kettenheim (1481), Keluchem / Ketenhon / Cetenhem / Kentuchen / Kettenoffen (1544), Kettenhoven (1568-1570), Cettenhouen (1589), Kattenhous (1594), Catnum (16th century), Katenom (1668), Catnom (1685), Kethenoven (1686), Cattenom (1793).

Nuclear power station 

Cattenom is well known for its nuclear power plant, which was built from 1987 to 1992. 
An artificial lake has been introduced to cool the four nuclear reactors. The creation of this lake has led to the flooding of Ouvrage Kobenbusch, part of the Maginot Line.

See also
 Communes of the Moselle department

References

External links

 Official website (in French)

Communes of Moselle (department)